Kama Sutra is a softcore television show on Showtime.

Episode list
 "Love Quarrels" – June 24, 2000
 "Nirvana" – July 1, 2000
 "The Art of Personal Adornment" – July 8, 2000  
 "Menage a Trois" – July 22, 2000  
 "Conduct of a Wife" – July 29, 2000 
 "Carnal Heat" – August 5, 2000 
 "The Art of Biting" – August 12, 2000 
 "Women of the Royal Harem" – August 19, 2000
 "For the Wives of Others" – August 26, 2000 
 "The Acquisition of the Girl" – September 2, 2000 
 "Transition to Lovemaking" – September 9, 2000 
 "Special Tastes" – September 16, 2000  
 "On the Means of Exciting Desire" – September 23, 2000 
 "The Kiss That Awakens" – September 30, 2000
 "Master and Servant" – October 7, 2000

External links
 

2000s American drama television series
2000 American television series debuts
2000 American television series endings
Showtime (TV network) original programming